Dappankuthu (or simply Kuthu) is a folk dance and music genre with an emphasis on percussion performed in the South Indian state of Tamil Nadu. It is one of several popular genres employed in film music, mainly in Tamil cinema and other South films, filmed and produced by people of Tamil culture.

Unlike classical Indian dances such as bharatanatyam or kathakali, dappankuthu is relatively informal in that it has no structured, repeated steps and dancers do not learn through formal dance classes. It shares its emphasis on percussion with older folk dances of Tamil Nadu, such as kummi and kolattam.

Musical instruments 

A percussion instrument called  Tharai thappattai in Tamil,  without the jingles, is often used for dappankuthu or similar dance forms. Unlike normal tambourines, this requires a wooden stick to play. The urumee drum is also often used. A customised trumpet (called Nadaswaram locally) is also sometimes employed. The rhythm of the dappankuthu is often signified by a mix of beat patterns layered and flowing into one another. Other percussion instruments may be employed in dappankuthu. A similar instrument called TamaTe in Kannada resembling a Ganesh tambourine is also used for such dance forms in border areas such as M.M. Hills.

Outfit and embellishments 
Even though any attire can be worn when one dances the dappankuthu, a lungi (colourful cloth wrapped around the waist) is commonly worn and most preferable, with the bottom raised and folded upwards over the knees in the middle. Ideally, it should be worn over pattapatti (lined trousers). The shirt worn would have only two or three buttons in place, while the chest portion is left wide open and at the lower part of the shirt is knotted (using the two portions of the shirt). It is also common to tie a handkerchief or bandana around one's forehead and/or wrist.

Loud clapping and whistling by spectators often accompany the dappankuthu dance. Spectators are also known to set off firecrackers called locally as "Pattaasu" on the ground during the performance.

Facial expressions are employed for effect by the dancers. For example, the tongue, folded over and held in position with the front teeth, is brought out at regular intervals.

In Male Mahadeshwara hills of Karnataka bordering Tamil Nadu, the music for this dance will be played for money, and the believers can dance for longer time.
Particularly in this hill, there is a saying that god feels happy if his believers dance for him.

In popular culture 
 The genre has been used in several films of Tamil cinema, and was noticeably used in the songs "Boyz" and "Bird Flu" by M.I.A. on her 2007 album Kala.

References

External links 
A sample of the dappankuthu dance
A sample of the dappankuthu beat

Tamil dance styles
Culture of Chennai
Tamil music
Folk dances of Tamil Nadu